Kahnuj Sadat (also Romanized as Kahnūj Sādāt; also known as Kahnūj) is a village in Sarduiyeh Rural District, Sarduiyeh District, Jiroft County, Kerman Province, Iran. At the 2006 census, its population was 421, in 89 families.

References 

Populated places in Jiroft County